The Mitchell House is a historic house in rural Yell County, Arkansas.  It is located on the north side of Arkansas Highway 80, east of the Waltreak Methodist Church, in a northeastern finger of the Ouachita National Forest.  The house is a single-story dogtrot structure, with a gable roof and a cross-gabled rear kitchen ell.  The central breezeway has been enclosed, and houses the building entrance, which is sheltered by a shed-roof porch artfully decorated with vernacular woodwork.  Built in 1891, it is one of the few 19th-century buildings surviving in the area, and is a well-preserved and unusual example of the dogtrot form.

The house was listed on the National Register of Historic Places in 1990.

See also
National Register of Historic Places listings in Yell County, Arkansas

References

Houses on the National Register of Historic Places in Arkansas
Greek Revival architecture in Arkansas
Houses completed in 1891
Houses in Yell County, Arkansas
National Register of Historic Places in Yell County, Arkansas
Dogtrot architecture in Arkansas
Ouachita National Forest